Joseph Gelineau, SJ (31 October 1920 – 8 August 2008)  was a French Jesuit priest and composer, mainly of modern Christian liturgical music. He was a member of the translation committee for La Bible de Jérusalem (1959).

Gelineau was born in Champ-sur-Layon, Maine-et-Loire. Having entered the Society of Jesus in 1941, he studied Catholic theology in Lyon and music in Paris. He was one of the founders of the international study group on music and liturgy Universa Laus.

Heavily influenced by Gregorian chant, he developed his Gelineau psalmody which is used worldwide. His psalm tones were designed to express the asymmetrical, three to four line design of the psalm texts. He collaborated with the Dominican  Raymond-Jacques Tournay and R. Schwab to rework the Jerusalem Bible Psalter. Their joint effort produced the Psautier de la Bible de Jerusalem and recording Psaumes, which won the Gran Prix de L' Academie Charles Cros in 1953. Later he composed numerous chants for the ecumenical French Taizé Community. He was associated with the Institut Catholique de Paris.

He died in Sallanches, aged 87.

Selected recordings
 Hymnes de Joseph Gelineau 4CD, Studio SM
 Psaumes de Joseph Gelineau 4CD, Studio SM
 Psalms: A New Way Of Singing, vinyl album, Grail, UK

References

External links
 "Rest In Peace Fr. Joseph Gelineau, S.J."
 

1920 births
2008 deaths
French composers of sacred music
French male composers
Composers of Christian music
20th-century French Jesuits
21st-century French Jesuits
French Roman Catholic priests
20th-century French musicians
21st-century French musicians
Taizé Community
20th-century French male musicians
21st-century French male musicians